Indonesia competed at the 2012 Summer Paralympics in London, United Kingdom, from August 29 to September 9.

For its ninth participation in the Paralympic Games, the country fielded a delegation of four athletes in four different sports.

Medallists

Athletics

Setiyo Budi Hartanto (a left forearm amputee) competed in the men's long jump and triple jump F46 (a category for athletes with disabilities affecting the upper limbs or the torso).

Men’s Field Events

Powerlifting

Ni Nengah Widiasih competed in the women's under 40kg event.

Women

Swimming

Agus Ngaimin (who is paralysed from the waist down) competed in the men's 100m backstroke S6.

Men

Table tennis

David Jacobs competed in the men's singles, class 10 (a category for standing players with a comparatively low level of disability).

Men

See also
Summer Paralympic disability classification
Indonesia at the Paralympics
Indonesia at the 2012 Summer Olympics

Notes

Nations at the 2012 Summer Paralympics
2012
Paralympics